Kevin Flint  is  a former Australian rules footballer who played with Collingwood in the Victorian Football League (VFL).

Flint coached Osborne Football Club in the Central Riverina Football League in 1954.

Notes

External links 

Living people
1932 births
Australian rules footballers from Tasmania
Collingwood Football Club players